Hunters of Dune is the first of two books written by Brian Herbert and Kevin J. Anderson to conclude Frank Herbert's original Dune series of science fiction novels.

The cliffhanger ending of Frank Herbert's Chapterhouse: Dune (1985) and his subsequent death in 1986 left some overarching plotlines unresolved. Released on August 22, 2006, Hunters continues the story of the danger posed to humanity by a remote, unnamed, but ever-present "great enemy". The novel is based on notes left behind by Frank Herbert, but Hunters and its 2007 sequel Sandworms of Dune represent the authors' version of what Frank Herbert referred to as Dune 7, his own planned seventh novel in the Dune series.

The first five chapters of the novel were available prior to the novel's publication via free download from the official Dune website, released monthly from March until July in 2006.

Plot
For three years, the no-ship Ithaca has been in an alternate universe, hiding from the "great enemy". It carries the clones, or gholas, of Duncan Idaho, famous military commander Miles Teg, the Bene Gesserit Sheeana, the last Bene Tleilax Master Scytale, and seven small melange-producing sandworms, as well as a number of other humans. Scytale has shared the secret of producing melange, also called spice, in tanks, because the sandworms do not produce enough to allow the ship to continue travelling. The mysterious Oracle of Time speaks to Duncan and brings the no-ship back into the 'regular' universe. The ship is discovered by the mysterious Daniel and Marty, first mentioned at the end of Chapterhouse: Dune. They attempt to capture the ship, but it escapes.

On Chapterhouse, the only remaining source of spice, Murbella, now the leader of the Honored Matres and Bene Gesserit, is attempting to merge the groups into the New Sisterhood and prevent civil war. Desperate for more spice so that their Navigators can travel through space, the Spacing Guild approaches her, but Murbella refuses, threatening to cut them off completely. Unbeknownst to everyone but the Bene Gesserit, the sandworms on Chapterhouse are not producing much melange; the Bene Gesserit are making up the shortfall with their own stockpiles.

Though the Honored Matres had destroyed all Bene Tleilax worlds, their descendants (the Lost Tleilaxu) have returned from The Scattering. They use the shape-stealing Face Dancers for espionage, until the Face Dancers kill the Tleilaxu Elder Burah and replace him with a duplicate. It is revealed that they have replaced all the Lost Tleilaxu Elders, as well as countless humans on various planets in the Old Empire. Their leader Khrone sends the scribe Uxtal to serve the rebel Honored Matre leader Hellica, who has proclaimed herself Matre Superior and now rules the conquered Bene Tleilax homeworld, Tleilax.

The desperate Spacing Guild goes to Ix seeking an alternative means of space travel. Khrone and his Face Dancers have secretly infiltrated Ix, plotting to dominate the universe. Working with Daniel and Marty, Khrone offers their advanced navigation technology to the Guild as if it were of Ixian design. The Guild agrees to the development of this technology if they have a monopoly on it.

Uxtal has been forced to use Tleilaxu axlotl tank technology to produce the adrenaline-enhancing drug used by Honored Matres. Khrone tasks Uxtal to make a ghola of Baron Vladimir Harkonnen, which is as sociopathic as the original. Khrone obtains the blood of Paul Atreides and has Uxtal make a ghola of Paul; he intends to use the ghola of the Baron to twist Paul's ghola into a weapon for Daniel and Marty's conquest of the universe. Later, Guild Navigator Edrik comes to Tleilax seeking Uxtal's knowledge of axlotl tanks; the Navigator fears his kind's obsolescence when the Ixian navigation technology becomes available. He seeks a tank-based source of spice to break the Bene Gesserit monopoly, but everyone believes that technology died with the Tleilaxu Masters. Eventually he accesses the genetic material of deceased Master Waff, and creates several Waff gholas, hoping to recover the lost technology.

The Tleilaxu sustain their lives indefinitely using gholas; Scytale's current body is dying, and he does not have a replacement. He has only one secret to use as a bargaining tool: a hidden nullentropy capsule containing cells of numerous important historical and legendary figures secretly collected by the Tleilaxu for millennia, as far back as the Butlerian Jihad. The Bene Gesserit have a vicious debate over whether to create gholas of any of these historical figures. A few at a time, the historical gholas are created, and Scytale is given a new body.

On Chapterhouse, Murbella creates the Valkyries, an elite New Sisterhood strike force. They successfully attack rebel Honored Matre strongholds on other planets, discovering that some of the Honored Matres are disguised Face Dancers. Murbella accesses the Other Memory from her Honored Matre ancestors and learns their true origins: they were vengeful Tleilaxu females, freed and assimilated by Fish Speakers and Bene Gesserit fleeing in The Scattering. Tleilaxu females had been enslaved for use as axlotl tanks by Tleilaxu males for millennia. These origins have been forgotten; Murbella now understands why the Honored Matres annihilated the Tleilaxu worlds in the Old Empire. Murbella also accesses a memory showing the origins of the mysterious force the Honored Matres call the Enemy.

On the no-ship, rebel Bene Gesserit attempt to murder the Leto II ghola, but are foiled when he transforms into a sandworm. The Paul ghola steals and consumes an overdose of spice in an attempt to remember his past, but instead has a vision of being stabbed by an evil version of himself. After being discovered by the Bene Gesserit, he concludes that he has regained prescience. Sheeana has visions that suggest the use of the gholas is dangerous, and halts the program until she knows more.

Daniel and Marty tell Khrone to discard the Baron Harkonnen and Paul Atreides gholas, as they have lured the Ithaca into a trap, and will soon capture the ghola of Paul Atreides on board. Working to his own ends, Khrone continues to prepare the gholas, restoring the Baron's memories and instructing him to train the Paul ghola, which he renames Paolo. Paolo does not yet have his memories.

Murbella contracts Ix's competitor Richese to provide armaments for a confrontation with the great enemy, but the rebel Honored Matres destroy the planet to cripple the Sisterhood. Murbella and her Valkyries successfully assault Tleilax, the most powerful of the rebel Honored Matre strongholds, and discover that many, including Matre Superior Hellica, were Face Dancers. Uxtal dies trying to escape, but the remaining Waff ghola finds refuge with the Spacing Guild, offering Edrik the genetic knowledge for the Guild to create their own sandworms.

The Ithaca stumbles upon the homeworld of the Handlers. An exploratory party from the no-ship discovers that the Handlers are actually Face Dancers, and barely escape back to the ship. Some Face Dancer ships crash into the Ithaca, and the chaos makes it impossible to know if any passengers have been replaced by Face Dancers. The emergency forces Miles Teg to reveal his hidden power of superhuman speed.

Murbella, now in complete control of the Honored Matres and Bene Gesserit, prepares a defense against the forces of the great enemy, now identified by Other Memory to be thinking machines of Omnius, the machine overlord destroyed in the ancient Butlerian Jihad. The Oracle of Time is revealed to be the living consciousness of Norma Cenva, somehow also still in existence millennia after the Jihad.

Daniel and Marty are revealed to be Omnius and the independent robot, Erasmus. Before its destruction, the Omnius incarnation on Giedi Prime had launched 5,000 probes capable of constructing new machine colonies on any planets encountered. One of these probes eventually intercepted a signal transmitted by the last remaining Omnius on Corrin before it too was destroyed. Its forces and Synchronized Empire finally reassembled, the new version of the Evermind is on the way back to the Old Empire to destroy all humanity.

Reception
The New York Times said of Hunters of Dune that "Brian Herbert and Kevin J. Anderson go through the motions, but they don't often seem to be having much fun with their material ... by the end of Hunters, they have done little more than set the table for Sandworms of Dune."

References

2006 American novels
2006 science fiction novels
Dune (franchise) novels
Novels by Kevin J. Anderson
Novels by Brian Herbert
Novels set on fictional planets
Tor Books books